Andy Pyle (born 15 July 1946, Luton, Bedfordshire, England) is a British bassist. He played with The Kinks from 1976 to 1978. Prior to that, he was in Blodwyn Pig (1968–1972) and Savoy Brown (1972–1974). Later, he played with Wishbone Ash (1986–87, 1991–93).

Career 
A musician whose career dates back to the mid-1960s, Pyle was born in Luton in 1946 and reached his teenage years when rock & roll supplanted skiffle as the music of choice for British youth. As a budding young musician, however, he was turning more towards blues than rock & roll, as evidenced by his first professional concert with Victor Brox's Blues Train, directed by the future member of the Aynsley Dunbar Retaliation. Then, Jensen's Moods, a band composed of British bluesman Mick Abrahams on guitar and vocals, Pete Fensome on vocals and Clive Bunker on drums, who then changed their name to McGregor's Engine.

Pyle continued his career with the McGregor's Engine group in his home town of Luton, Bedfordshire, in 1967. That same year, Abrahams caught the attention of flautist-singer Ian Anderson, while McGregor's Engine first played John Evan Band with which officiates Anderson, during a concert. When Bunker and Abrahams left McGregor's Engine to form Jethro Tull with Ian Anderson on flute and vocals and Glenn Cornick on bass, Pyle continued to play with local bands. Abrahams left Jethro Tull after the first album This Was, following a dispute with Anderson about the band's future, to form Blodwyn Pig with Pyle on bass, Jack Lancaster on saxophone and Ron Berg on drums. After the Blodwyn Pig disbanded, Pyle joined Juicy Lucy (who includes Micky Moody who would play later with Whitesnake) and Savoy Brown, as well as sessions for Rod Stewart on his 1971 album, Every Picture Tells a Story.

In 1975/76, Pyle spent a year recording and playing with guitarist Alvin Lee, a former Ten Years After guitarist. He playeds on Lee's first solo album, Pump Iron with former King Crimson musicians, Boz Burrell on bass, Ian Wallace on drums, and Mel Collins on saxophone. The same year, he participated in the concept album Peter and the Wolf by Jack Lancaster and Robin Lumley, with musicians of different horizons, Alvin Lee, Gary Moore and John Goodsall on guitar, Percy Jones and Dave Marquee at the bass, Brian Eno, Manfred Mann on synths, Bill Bruford and Phil Collins on drums, Stephane Grapelli on violin, etc.

At the end of 1976, Pyle auditioned for the bassist position with the Kinks following the departure of John Dalton. He played on Mr. Big Man on the band's 1977 album  Sleepwalker, the single only track Father Christmas and 1978's Misfits where he only appeared on six of the ten songs, before leaving with keyboardist John Gosling. The two formed an ephemeral group, initially called United (with future Iron Maiden guitarist, Dennis Stratton), then Network. His work with them was short-lived, since he was then called by his old friend Gary Moore, with whom he had previously worked as a session musician, to join his band in a series of live dates, which resulted in an album Live at The Marquee. Pyle then joined a reformed version of Chicken Shack before teaming up with their leader Stan Webb in the Speedway band. In the mid-1980s, he joined Wishbone Ash, then Mick Abrahams and Clive Bunker, as well as Dick Heckstall-Smith saxophone legend making their return for another tour with Blodwyn Pig. With Bernie Marsden, he was part of the Green & Blue All-Stars, and he was back with Gary Moore, this time in the Midnight Blues Band. He spent most of the early to mid-1990s working with Moore, then back in Wishbone Ash and Juicy Lucy. Even though he played everything from traditional rock to hard rock, he prefers blues and even managed to perform in the Carey Bell and Nappy Brown sessions in the 1980s.

He produced his only solo album in 1985 titled Barrier Language which went virtually unnoticed. After the departure of Mervyn Spence, Pyle was offered the vacant bassist position at Wishbone Ash in early 1986. An intensive touring period ensued, including appearances in Russia in 1987, before Pyle gave in to allow the reform of the original Wishbone Ash training. However, Andy Powell and Pyle remained close friends and continued to collaborate on songs. Pyle is also co-author of the title track of the album Strange Affair. Pyle, meanwhile, joined Gary Moore once again and appeared on the album Still Got the Blues in 1990.

In 1991, Pyle joined Wishbone Ash following the second split of Martin Turner with the band. A two-year period of touring followed, as evidenced by the 1992 film The Ash Live in Chicago. In 1994, he met Mick Abrahams and Blodwyn Pig when he appeared on the I Wonder Who song on the album Lies.

More recently, Pyle played on the album Running Blind (2002) as a member of ex-Uriah Heep Ken Hensley's solo band. He also performed in an exceptional concert with Ken Hensley and John Wetton, who was filmed and recorded for the DVD release of More Than Conquerors in 2002.

Discography

Solo 

1985: Barrier Language

With Blodwyn Pig 

Studio albums :

 1969: Ahead Rings Out
 1970: Getting to This
 1994: Lies – Pyle plays on I Wonder Who

Live albums:

 1997: Live At The Lafayette – recorded in 1993
 1997: The Modern Alchemist
 2000: The Basement Tapes
 2002: Live At The Marquee Club London 1974 (The Official Bootleg)
 2012: Radio Sessions '69 to '71
 2003: Rough Gems (Official Bootleg Number 2)

Compilation:

 2013: Pigthology

With Rod Stewart 

 1971: Every Picture Tells a Story

With Juicy Lucy 

 1972: Pieces

With Savoy Brown 

 1972: Lion's Share
 1973: Jack the Toad

With Gerry Lockran 

1972: Wun – Pyle plays on Maybe Not Up, Tired Neal Groans and She Was A Very Good Friend Of Mine

With Alvin Lee 

 1976: Pump Iron

With The Kinks 

 1977: Sleepwalker – Pyle plays on Mr. Big Man
 1978: Misfits – Pyle plays on nine of the album's ten songs

With Gary Moore 

 1983: Live at the Marquee
 1990: Still Got the Blues
 1993: Blues Alive
 1995: Blues for Greeny – tribute album to Peter Green
 2009: Essential Montreux – 5-CD boxset

With Wishbone Ash 

 1992: The Ash Live in Chicago

With Ken Hensley 

 2002: Running Blind – with John Wetton on bass and vocals, Dave Kilminster on guitar and John Young on keyboards, plus three drummers

With Ken Hensley & John Wetton 

 2002: More Than Conquerors(DVD) – with the same line-up

Collaboration 

 1975: Peter and the Wolf by Jack Lancaster and Robin Lumley – with Brian Eno, Phil Collins, Gary Moore, Stephane Grapelli, Bill Bruford, John Goodsall, Percy Jones, Julie Tippett, Keith Tippett, etc. Pyle plays on "Duck Theme" and "Rock And Roll Celebration".

References 

 Andy Pyle | Biography & History
 Mick Abrahams
 Andy Pyle
 Blodwyn Pig Albums
 Alvin Lee Discography
 Wishbone Ash – Live In Chicago
 Ken Hensley Running Blind : KEN HENSLEY – Running Blind (2002) 
 Ken Hensley/John Wetton : KEN HENSLEY – Ken Hensley & John Wetton. More Than Conquerors (2002) 
 Jack Lancaster, Robin Lumley – The Rock Peter And The Wolf

1946 births
Living people
People from Luton
English rock bass guitarists
Male bass guitarists
Wishbone Ash members
The Kinks members
The Gary Moore Band members
Savoy Brown members
Chicken Shack members
Blodwyn Pig members